James J. Walker Park is a public park in the Greenwich Village neighborhood of Lower Manhattan in New York City, New York. The approximately  park, is bound by Varick Street, the St. Luke's Place section of Leroy Street, Hudson Street and Clarkson Street.  The park has a baseball field, bocce courts, playgrounds, bathrooms, handball courts and Wi-Fi hotspots, as well as a memorial dedicated to two deceased firefighters.

The park is adjacent to the Tony Dapolito Recreation Center, formerly the Carmine Recreation Center in honor of Trinity Episcopal Church vestryman and  colonial landowner Nicholas Carman (changed to Carmine to reflect Italians in the area), at the intersection of Carmine and Clarkson Streets with Seventh Avenue South.  It was named after a long-time president of Community Board 2, Anthony V. Dapolito, who was known as the "Mayor of Greenwich Village."

History

The area that is now James J. Walker Park was once the St. John's Burying Ground for St. John's Chapel of Trinity Church. It was in use from 1799 to 1858, with over 10,000 burials there. New York politician William H. Walker originated the idea for the park in 1888.  In 1890 he succeeded in getting a bill through the legislature condemning the ground for park purposes.  The parks department acquired the land in 1895; most of those buried there were not removed.

The park – which was designed by the architectural firm of Carrere & Hastings –  was originally called "St. John's Park," which had also been the name of a no-longer-extant park about a mile south on Hudson Street from about 1827 to 1867. The later park was renamed "Hudson Park" in 1896, and finally became "James J. Walker Park" in 1947, named after former mayor Jimmy Walker, whose family had moved to 6 St. Luke's Place in 1886.

The park was renovated in 1972 and again in 1996.

Notable residents
 Edgar Allan Poe, according to a handwritten annotation on an old map

Gallery

See also
 St. John's Burying Ground

References

External links

James J. Walker Park at NYC Parks

Greenwich Village
Parks in Manhattan
Urban public parks